Miss Teen USA 1990, the 8th Miss Teen USA pageant, was televised live from Mississippi Gulf Coast Coliseum, Biloxi, Mississippi, on July 16, 1990. At the conclusion of the final competition, Bridgette Wilson of Oregon was crowned by outgoing titleholder Brandi Sherwood of Idaho.

1990 marked the year that Oregon won the pageant for the second of three times in the history of the pageant. Oregon and Texas are the only states that have won more than two Miss Teen USA titles, Oregon: Mindy Duncan in 1988, Bridgette Wilson in 1990 and Tami Farrell in 2003. Texas: Christie Lee Woods in 1996, Danielle Doty in 2011, and Karlie Hay in 2016.
 
This was the first year the pageant was held at the Mississippi Gulf Coast Coliseum in Biloxi, where it would be held for the following four years.

Sandy Duncan hosted the event for the only time, with color commentary by Leeza Gibbons and Miss Teen USA 1985 Kelly Hu. Music was provided by the Gulf Coast Teen Orchestra.  Duncan was the first female host of an American beauty pageant.

Results

Placements

Final competition

Special awards

Historical significance 
 Oregon wins competition for the second time. Also becomes the 1st state to win the title more than once and does so in a three-year timespan.
 Alaska earns the 1st runner-up position for the first time and reached its highest placement ever at the pageant.
 Georgia earns the 2nd runner-up position for the first time.
 Kentucky finishes as Top 6  for the first time.
 Pennsylvania finishes as Top 6  for the first time.
 Texas finishes as Top 6 for the first time. 
 States that placed in semifinals the previous year were Kentucky and Texas. 
 Texas placed for the third consecutive year.
 Kentucky made its second consecutive placement.
 Louisiana and Oregon last placed in 1988.
 California, Georgia and Massachusetts last placed in 1987.
 Missouri last placed in 1985.
 Pennsylvania last placed in 1983.
 Alaska placed for the first time.
 Arizona placed for the first time.
 Colorado placed for the first time.
 Alabama breaks an ongoing streak of placements since 1988.
 New York breaks an ongoing streak of placements since 1986.

Delegates
The Miss Teen USA 1990 delegates were:

 Alabama - Candi Byrd
 Alaska - Marla Johnson
 Arizona - Jeri-Lynn Beatty
 Arkansas - Karen Pugh
 California - Trisha Robey
 Colorado - Shalon Pekosky
 Connecticut - Amy Riboink
 Delaware - Kristen Pontius
 District of Columbia - Cherrelle Robinson
 Florida - Michelle Benitez
 Georgia - Holly Roehl
 Hawaii - Sunny Kenaialpuni
 Idaho - Jody Walker
 Illinois - Terri Bollinger
 Indiana - Kristen Helms
 Iowa - Faith Windsor
 Kansas - Carrie Williams
 Kentucky - April Vaughan
 Louisiana - Ali Landry
 Maine - Michelle Grenier
 Maryland - Mary Ann Cimino
 Massachusetts - Nina Cammaratta
 Michigan - Erica Weber
 Minnesota - Jennifer Bell
 Mississippi - Kim Faulkner
 Missouri - Tavia Shackles
 Montana - Stephanie Wallace
 Nebraska - Shauna Redfern
 Nevada - J.J. Casper
 New Hampshire - Sarah McFall
 New Jersey - Jennifer Giordano
 New Mexico - Beth Baskin
 New York -  Catherine Bliss
 North Carolina - Heather Simmons
 North Dakota - Sherry Bernadis
 Ohio - Heather Wilpert
 Oklahoma - Carmen James
 Oregon - Bridgette Wilson
 Pennsylvania - Susan Barnett
 Rhode Island - Claudia Jordan  
 South Carolina - Katherine Hancock
 South Dakota - Petrona Usera
 Tennessee - Kristen Cassell
 Texas - Becky Fisher
 Utah - Melissa Leigh Anderson
 Vermont - Gessica Tortolono
 Virginia - Yuranda Harris
 Washington - Paige Anderson
 West Virginia - Mindy Green
 Wisconsin - Deborah Santacrothie
 Wyoming - Janet Poccup

Dolphin controversy
In a pre-taped segment for the pageant telecast on July 2, a small group of delegates was filmed playing with dolphins in a training pool at the Marine Life Oceanarium.  This led to a probe by the National Marine Fisheries Service to investigate whether the oceanarium was in violation of its permit by allowing the delegates to swim with the dolphins.  It was later decided that the segment would be edited so that it only showed the delegates feeding the mammals.

References

External links
Official website

1990
1990 beauty pageants
1990 in Mississippi